Louane (also spelled Lou-Anne or Louanne) is a French feminine name, derived from a combination of the names Louise and Anne. It rose in popularity in the early 2000s, reaching number one in the top 100 names given to baby girls in France in 2014. The short form Lou, is also popular for girls in France.

People with the given name
 Louane (singer), mononym of French singer, participant in series 2 of The Voice: la plus belle voix
 LouAnne Johnson, American writer
 Louanne Sirota, American actress

Characters
 Luann Van Houten (née Mussolini), fictional character from the TV series The Simpsons
 Louanne Katraine, fictional character from the TV series Battlestar Galactica

Notes

French feminine given names